Kazo, also spelled Kazu, Kâzo, Kazou, Kāzū, is a neighbourhood located in Hama, Syria.

References

External links
 Kazo at Wikimapia

Hama